Balçova Yaşamspor, or for sponsorship reasons Fabrika Bakım Montaj Balçova Yaşamspor, is a football club located in İzmir, Turkey. The team competes in Turkish Regional Amateur League. The club was promoted to the TFF Third League after the 2012–13 season.

Previous names

 Fahrettin Altay Spor Kulübü (1991–2012)
 Balçova Belediyespor (2012–2014)
 FBM Balçova Yaşamspor (2014–Present)

League participations
TFF Third League: 2013–2015
Turkish Regional Amateur League: 2012–2013, 2015–present

Stadium
Currently the team plays at Kemalpaşa Ulucak Stadium.

Current squad

References

External links 
Balçova Yaşamspor on TFF.org

TFF Third League clubs
Football clubs in Turkey
Balçova